James Melvin Stroner (May 29, 1901 – December 6, 1975) was a third baseman in Major League Baseball. He played for the Pittsburgh Pirates.

References

External links

1901 births
1975 deaths
Major League Baseball third basemen
Pittsburgh Pirates players
Baseball players from Chicago
Williamston Martins players